Vinke is a surname. Notable people with the surname include:

 Cécile Vinke (born 1973), Dutch field hockey player
 Heinz Vinke (1920–1944), German aviator
 Peter Vinke (died 1702), English divine
 Philipine Vinke (born 1968), Dutch artist

See also
 Finke